Maria Olsson (born 8 December 1986) is a Swedish handball player for Aalborg DH and the Swedish national team.

References

1986 births
Living people
Swedish female handball players